The Somali courser (Cursorius somalensis) is a wader in the pratincole and courser family, Glareolidae.

Although classed as waders,  these are birds of dry open country, preferably semi-desert, where they typically hunt their insect prey by running on the ground.

This is a small bird that lives in the eastern Africa:
C. s. somaliensis (Shelley, 1885) in Eritrea, eastern Ethiopia and Somaliland and C. s. littoralis (Erlanger, 1905) in extreme southeast South Sudan, northern and eastern Kenya, and southern Somalia. It feeds on insects and seeds and lives in open, short grasslands and burnt veld. It grows to eight or nine inches in height. The somali courser has black lines behind his eyes, when seen from behind it looks like a "V".

References

Somali courser
Birds of the Horn of Africa
Somali courser
Taxa named by George Ernest Shelley